Serge Thomas (born 24 June 1951) is a French boxer. He competed in the men's featherweight event at the 1976 Summer Olympics. He lost in round 32 to Rene Weller of West Germany.

References

1951 births
Living people
French male boxers
Olympic boxers of France
Boxers at the 1976 Summer Olympics
Place of birth missing (living people)
Featherweight boxers